CCGS W.E. Ricker was a Canadian Coast Guard offshore fisheries research vessel. The ship was originally constructed as the commercial fishing trawler Callistratus, but was purchased by the Government of Canada in 1984 and converted to a fisheries research vessel and renamed W.E. Ricker. The vessel entered service with the Department of Fisheries and Oceans in 1986 and was transferred to the Canadian Coast Guard in 1995 after the two fleets were amalgamated. The ship was assigned to the West Coast of Canada and was decommissioned on 14 March 2017.

Design and description
The ship was propelled by one controllable pitch propeller driven by one Akasaka AH40 six-cylinder geared diesel engine, creating . W.E. Ricker also had one Perkins 2430 emergency generator. The ship had a complement of 20, composed of 9 officers and 11 crew with 17 spare berths.

Service history
The ship was ordered from Narasaki Senpakukogyo Limited at their yard in Muroran, Japan with the yard number 922. The vessel was completed in December 1978 as Callistratus. The vessel was purchased in 1984 by the Government of Canada for conversion to a fisheries research vessel in Pacific waters. The ship entered service with the Department of Fisheries and Oceans in 1986, renamed W.E. Ricker, for William Edwin (Bill) Ricker, a former chief scientist of the Fisheries Research Board who developed a mathematical model used for fish population dynamics.

In 1995, in an effort to combine tasks, administration and making savings in both ships and funds, the Fisheries and Oceans and Canadian Coast Guard fleets were merged under the command of the Canadian Coast Guard. W.E. Ricker was given the new prefix CCGS as a result. The vessel continued to be used for fisheries research in Pacific waters. In September 2009 the Department of Fisheries and Oceans announced invitations for contracts to replace several of the Coast Guard's research vessels, including W.E. Ricker. The ship was taken out of service on 14 March 2017 due to lack of seaworthiness. W.E. Ricker was put up for sale for scrap only due to the vessel's poor condition.

On 4 August 2020, a contract was awarded to Canadian Maritime Engineering Ltd. to dispose of W.E. Ricker. The dismantling is being completed at the Canadian Maritime Engineering Ltd Nanaimo B.C. Division. The contract has a completion date of the end of February 2022. During disassembly a worker was seriously injured by a falling beam.

References

Notes

Citations

Sources

External links

 Photos of FV Callistratus in Prince Rupert, 1979 from UNBC Northern BC Archives

Ships of the Canadian Coast Guard
Research vessels of Canada
Research vessels of Japan
Ships built in Japan